Cosmin Alin Năstăsie (born 22 June 1983 Drăgăşani, Romania) is a Romanian former footballer who played as a winger for FC Argeș Pitești, CS Mioveni and FC Brașov.

External links
 
 
 

1983 births
Living people
People from Drăgășani
Romanian footballers
Association football midfielders
Liga I players
Liga II players
FC Argeș Pitești players
FC Brașov (1936) players
CS Mioveni players